Los Beatniks were an early Argentine rock garage group. Active in the middle years of the 1960s, they went down in trivia history as recording the first original rock single in Argentina titled "Rebelde". Despite their short career, the band are considered one of the pioneers of Argentine rock.

History 
The band featured three key figures of the early rock movement in Argentina: Moris and Pajarito Zaguri in guitars and voice, Javier Martínez in drums. They were also the most important band playing at the "La Cueva" club in Buenos Aires, one of the mythical gathering spots from where many of the first Argentine rock bands would emerge.

The band did not have commercial success, due to this Los Beatniks broke up in 1967, a result of the commercial failures of their only single.

After the break-up
Moris began his solo career in 1968, Javier Martinez formed with Manal in 1968, with Alejandro Medina on bass guitar and Claudio Gabis on guitar. Pajarito Zaguri formed La Barra de Chocolate since 1968 to early 1971.

Discography 
Singles
 "Rebelde" / "No finjas más" (1966)

Compilations
 Leyendas del Rock Vol. 5 (2007)

References 

Argentine rock music groups
Garage rock groups